Philip John Moffat (born 29 May 1975) is an English former first-class cricketer.

Moffat was born at Lancaster in May 1975. He was educated at Lancaster Royal Grammar School, before matriculating to the University of Leeds. From there he proceeded to Hughes Hall at the University of Cambridge. While studying at Cambridge, he played first-class cricket for Cambridge University Cricket Club in 1998, making five appearances. Playing as a medium pace bowler in the Cambridge side, he took 7 wickets at an average of 33.14, with best figures of 3 for 25. As a lower order batsman, he scored 34 runs with a highest score of 12. His brother, Gavin, was also a first-class cricketer.

References

External links

1975 births
Living people
People from Lancaster, Lancashire
People educated at Lancaster Royal Grammar School
Alumni of the University of Leeds
Alumni of Hughes Hall, Cambridge
English cricketers
Cambridge University cricketers